Chief Clancy Wiggum is a fictional character from the animated television series The Simpsons, voiced by Hank Azaria. He is the chief of police in the show's setting of Springfield, and is the father of Ralph Wiggum and the husband of Sarah Wiggum.

Gluttonous, irresponsible, and immature, Wiggum is often too lazy, cowardly, and corrupt to bother fighting crime. His more responsible subordinate officers Eddie and Lou play the straight men to his shenanigans.

Character development 

His surname "Wiggum" is Matt Groening's mother's maiden name. As "a conscious pun", Wiggum was designed to look like a pig. Hank Azaria first based his voice for Wiggum on David Brinkley, but it was too slow and he switched it to an Edward G. Robinson impression.

Biography 
Chief Wiggum is of Irish descent. Per the episode "Raging Abe Simpson and His Grumbling Grandson in 'The Curse of the Flying Hellfish', it is revealed that Wiggum's father Iggy served in Abe Simpson's infantry squad. In the episode "Mother Simpson", a teenaged Wiggum was a trainee security guard at Springfield University when Homer's mother Mona sabotaged the University's laboratory, which Mr. Burns was using for biological weapons. Antibiotics used to kill the weapons cured Wiggum's asthma, allowing him to join the police force.

Many episodes have dealt with the back story of how Wiggum, despite his incompetence, occupies such a high rank in the police force. As with those of most supporting characters on the show, they are jokes for one episode and contradict each other. Wiggum was temporarily promoted to Commissioner of Police for Springfield's state in the 2005 episode "Pranksta Rap". He also appeared on Halloween novel depicting Stranger Things as chief Jim Hopper.

Positive qualities 

Despite his severe incompetence at his occupation, Wiggum on occasion has helped various other characters, such as helping Homer find his wife in "Marge on the Lam". He rescued Maggie Simpson when she ran away from home to look for Marge in "Homer Alone", by helping Lisa Simpson find Mr. Burns's assailant in "Who Shot Mr. Burns?" as well as helping backing her up in a school protest on one occasion in "The President Wore Pearls". In the episode "Pranksta Rap" he manages to find the presumed kidnapped Bart Simpson in Kirk Van Houten's apartment. He also arrived just in time during crucial moments such as the various times Sideshow Bob had attempted to kill Bart Simpson. Wiggum is also shown to be a loving father of his son Ralph. Perhaps the best example of this is the episode "Mother Simpson", where he leads the FBI astray in their search for Mona Simpson, allowing her to escape in gratitude for curing his asthma. 

Although Wiggum can often antagonize others as well, it is heavily implied that it is not out of malice but merely because he is doing his job or because he is ignorant of the situation. He also showed a great deal of insight during the episode "Chief of Hearts", where he and Homer become friends; when Homer asks him why he's willing to show Homer his favorite parts of Springfield, Wiggum tells him "Cops don't have many friends. Civilians are afraid of us, and other cops...they just remind us of things we want to forget."

References

External links

 Chief Wiggum on IMDb

Fictional American municipal police officers
Fictional police officers in television
Television characters introduced in 1990
Animated characters introduced in 1990
Fictional police commissioners
Male characters in animated series
The Simpsons characters
Cultural depictions of Edward G. Robinson
Characters created by Matt Groening